Melrose is a rural locality in the South Burnett Region, Queensland, Australia. In the  Melrose had a population of 0 people.

Geography
The Cushnie State Forest is in the north-east of the locality. Apart from that, the land use is grazing on native vegetation.

History
In the  Melrose had a population of 0 people.

References 

South Burnett Region
Localities in Queensland